, better known as , was a Japanese gravure idol (glamour model) and TV personality who gained popularity as a "poverty idol". She was represented by Platinum Production.

Biography

Life
Uehara was born on the island of Tanegashima in Kagoshima Prefecture, the youngest of 10 siblings. She attended high school in Kagoshima for a brief time before dropping out. She moved to Tokyo at the age of 17, and began glamour modeling while working as a hostess at a Tokyo hostess club.

She began to be known as a "poverty [poor] idol" because of her poor background, and after featuring on the cover of the Weekly Playboy magazine, she released her first photobook, Hare Tokidoki Namida (lit. "Fair, then Occasional Tears") in July 2009. She had appeared in a total of 445 television programs and two television commercials by May 2011.

Death
Uehara died at her apartment in Meguro, Tokyo early on 12 May 2011 at the age of 24, after apparently committing suicide by hanging. Police reported that no suicide note was found but there were some illegible messages scribbled possibly by her.

Works

Films
 Yatterman (2009)

Books
  (May 2009, Poplar)

See also
List of people who died by hanging

References

External links
 Platinum Production agency profile 
 Official blog 

Japanese gravure idols
Japanese television personalities
1987 births
2011 deaths
2011 suicides
Models from Kagoshima Prefecture
Suicides by hanging in Japan
Female suicides